Bambadjan Bamba (born in Abidjan) is an Ivorian-American actor and filmmaker known for his roles in Black Panther, Suicide Squad, and The Good Place. He is also a prominent immigrant rights advocate.

Life and career 
Bamba was born in the Ivory Coast and came to the United States at the age of 10 in the 90's. He spent his adolescent years in the South Bronx and Richmond, Virginia. He studied at the New York Conservatory for Dramatic Arts in New York City and is the owner of Ivostar Pictures.

He has appeared on television shows such as Grey's Anatomy, The Sopranos, and Bosch, and he had a recurring role on The Good Place. His film credits include Black Panther, Suicide Squad, and Beginners.

Advocacy 
In November 2017, in an interview with the Los Angeles Times, Bamba disclosed that he was a DACA recipient. He has since used his platform to advocate for undocumented immigrants to the United States. He has worked with Define American, a nonprofit media and culture organization which provides a venue for undocumented people to tell their own story, and he contributed to the anthology American Like Me: Reflections on life between cultures, edited by America Ferrera.

Bamba received the Courageous Advocate Award from the American Civil Liberties Union and the Courageous Luminary award from NILC (National Immigration Law Center).

Filmography

References

External links
 
 https://www.latinousa.org/2018/08/26/bambadjanbamba/
 http://www.jamati.com/online/film/exclusive-interview-with-law-order-actor-bambadjan-bamba/

21st-century American male actors
Place of birth missing (living people)
American male television actors
American male film actors
Ivorian emigrants to the United States
Living people
Undocumented immigrants to the United States
DACA recipients
Year of birth missing (living people)